Bhutanitis lidderdalii, the Bhutan glory, is a species of swallowtail butterfly (family Papilionidae), which is found in Bhutan, parts of northeastern India and of Southeast Asia. A spectacular insect much sought after by collectors, the species epithet is after Dr R. Lidderdale, from whose collection the butterfly was first described by William Stephen Atkinson in 1873. Listed under CITES Appendix II, the status of the butterfly has been recorded as rare by some authorities but as being of least concern in 2019 by the Red Book of the IUCN.

Description 

The sexes of the Bhutan glory are identical in appearance, having long rounded forewings with convex termen and many-tailed hindwings. The butterfly is dull black above with slim, wavy, cream-coloured striations running vertically across the wings. Above, the hindwing has a prominent, large tornal patch with yellow-orange lunules bordering the tails, central bluish-black patches with white ocelli and a crimson post-discal band on the inner edge. Below, the base colour is greyer, the striations are pronounced and the colours subdued or paler.

The detailed description provided by Charles Thomas Bingham (1907) is as follows:

Wingspan: 90–110 mm.

Distribution 

The butterfly was described by William Stephen Atkinson in the Proceedings of the Zoological Society of London in 1873. He writes:

George Talbot in The Fauna of British India, Including Ceylon and Burma (1939) provides some interesting detail: 

The butterfly is found in Bhutan and northeastern India (Assam, Sikkim, Manipur and Nagaland). It is also found in northern Myanmar, Thailand, Vietnam, Laos and Szechwan and Yunnan provinces of China.

Taxonomy 

There are a total of four subspecies of B. lidderdalii. These subspecies (with type localities) are:

 B. lidderdalii lidderdalii Atkinson 1873 - (nominate) Buxa, Bhutan
 B. lidderdalii spinosa Stichel, 1907 - Sichuan, China
 B. lidderdalii ocellatomaculata Igarashi, 1979 - Chiang Mai, northern Thailand
 B. lidderdalii nobucoae Morita, 1997 - north Kachin, Myanmar

Status 

The Bhutan glory has been considered to be "rare" by Indian authors such as William Harry Evans (1932), Mark Alexander Wynter-Blyth (1957) and Isaac Kehimkar (2009). The nominate subspecies is protected under law in India.

However Collins and Morris (1985) in the IUCN Red Data Book on the threatened swallowtails of the world gives it a status of "insufficiently known" arguing that the Bhutan glory is widely distributed and hence unlikely to be in danger at the moment though more information is needed on this comparatively poorly known species.

In 2019, it was listed as a least concern species in the Red List of the IUCN. International trade in B. lidderdalii is restricted under CITES Appendix II.

Habitat loss due to excessive felling of forests may be a significant threat regionally.

The Thai subspecies, found in northern Thailand around Chiang Mai is considered to be a relict population and hundreds of specimens were collected annually for the specimen. It is now believed to be extinct, probably due to loss of the population and damage to its habitat by forest fire.

Habitat 

It generally keeps to the ridges rather than the valleys.

Habits 

Flies at tree-top level, with a slow, drifting, unpredictable flight akin to that of the tree nymph (Idea lynceus). The butterflies transparent greyish underside makes it difficult to distinguish in the shadows. During rain, it sits on leaves with the forewings drooped over the hindwings, concealing its bright upper colouration. The butterfly has a habit of hill-topping and visits flowers of diverse species.

Life cycle 

It is known to have two broods - the first in May and June and the second from August to October. Likely to be unpalatable due to its food plant being Aristolochia species.

Food plant 

Larva on Aristolochia species such as A. kaempferii, A. mandshuriensis, A. griffithii, A. shimadai and A. debilis (Igarashi, 1985, 1989).

Cited references

See also 

 Papilionidae
 List of butterflies of India
 List of butterflies of India (Papilionidae)

External links 
 
 
 Bhutanitis lidderdalii on Tree of Life website
 Host plants of Bhutanitis lidderdalii on HOSTS - a Database of the World's Lepidopteran Hostplants. NMNH, London

lidderdalii
Butterflies of Indochina
Butterflies of Asia
Insects of Southeast Asia
Insects of Thailand
Butterflies described in 1873
Taxa named by William Stephen Atkinson